Operation Calendar in 1942 was an Anglo-American operation in World War II to deliver Supermarine Spitfire fighter aircraft to Malta. The aircraft were desperately needed to bolster the island's defence against strong Axis air raids.

Background
"Club Run" deliveries required the short-range fighters to be loaded onto an aircraft carrier in Britain or at Gibraltar and taken to within flying range of Malta where they would be "flown off" and make their own way to Malta. There had been several earlier "Club Runs" but by this time, no suitable British carriers were available. The situation was urgent, so, after a personal request from the British Prime Minister, Winston Churchill to American President Franklin D Roosevelt, the American aircraft carrier  was loaned for a "Club Run".

Operation

Wasp collected 52 aircraft from Shieldhall on the River Clyde, from No. 601 Squadron RAF and No. 603 Squadron RAF, with pilots. The aircraft were Spitfire Vcs fitted with external fuel tanks to extend their range. They were, however, inadequately prepared; external tanks leaked badly, (a fault that recurred on "Club Runs"), many of the aircraft's guns and some of their radios were defective. The Spitfires, originally painted in a desert camouflage scheme, were repainted dark blue in anticipation of the long flight across the sea once they had taken off from Wasp. 

During final preparations, the faults mentioned above were detected, but too late to be rectified.

On 20 April, with Wasps Grumman F4F Wildcats providing air cover, 47 Spitfires flew off. An RAF mechanic was killed during the operation; he had inadvertently backed into the spinning propeller of one of the Spitfires. Several of the pilots waiting to take off witnessed the incident.

The Spitfires of No. 601 Squadron landed at Luqa while all but one of No. 603 Squadron's aircraft safely arrived at Ta'Qali. The sole exception was that flown by Sergeant Bud Walcott, an American pilot, who made a forced landing south of the Atlas Mountains in Algeria. Another pilot subsequently reported that prior to take off, Walcott had told him that he had no intention of flying to Malta. Walcott meanwhile initially claimed that he did this as a result of interference from enemy aircraft but later claimed his Spitfire had developed a faulty undercarriage after taking off and he diverted to the nearest landfall. Interned by the Vichy French, he eventually was released and made his way back to the United Kingdom where he joined the United States Army Air Forces.

Aftermath
This addition to Malta's defences was in vain as the Luftwaffe anticipated the Spitfires arrival and bombed Ta'Qali airfield within minutes of their arrival. Most were caught on the ground and within 48 hours all were destroyed.

The island's Governor, Lieutenant General Sir William Dobbie, reported that the local condition was critical. He was soon replaced; the view was that he should have ensured adequate protection for the Spitfires and for an earlier convoy that had been sunk in the harbour, he was replaced by Lord Gort. The subsequent Operation Bowery was better planned and executed.

Notes

Footnotes

Citations

References

Battle of the Mediterranean
Malta Convoys
Conflicts in 1942
Naval battles and operations of the European theatre of World War II
April 1942 events